Digitivalva christophi is a moth of the family Acrolepiidae. It is found in Ukraine and Russia.

References

Acrolepiidae
Moths described in 1958